Western Highlands may refer to:

Western Highlands (Papua New Guinea)
Western High Plateau, a region of Cameroon
The western part of the Scottish Highlands